Then Churchill Said to Me is a television comedy series starring Frankie Howerd and Nicholas Courtney. Made in 1982, the series was not screened until 1993.

Outline
The comedy is set in Winston Churchill's secret underground wartime bunker. Howerd plays a soldier named Private Potts who, according to the DVD's cover, "acts as a batman to a group of officers". Like the character of Lurcio in the popular Up Pompeii!, he is hell-bent on avoiding work and gets into various scrapes as a result.

The premise of the show was similar in content to the previous Howerd vehicles (see also Whoops Baghdad) but in a more contemporary setting. In one episode Private Potts is revealed to be a doppelganger of a high-ranking general, also portrayed by Howerd, echoing storylines from these series and their big screen adaptations.

Cast
 Frankie Howerd as Private Percy Potts, a Batman in the underground Allied Army Headquarters, who spends most of the war avoiding work.
 Nicholas Courtney as Lt. Col. Robin Witherton, Potts commanding officer who is having a (not so) secret affair with his secretary, Petty Officer Bottomly.
 Joanna Dunham as Petty Officer Joan Bottomley, Witherton's secretary, described by Potts as a "Po-faced madam" who is mean to everyone except Witherton.
 Shaun Curry as Sgt. Maj. McRuckus, Potts superior officer who hates Potts as much as Potts hates him, described by Potts as a "big pig".
 James Chase as Batman MacKensey / Private Macclesfield
 Michael Attwell as Pvt. Norman Pain
 Peggy Ann Clifford as Tealady
 Linda Cunningham as Sally Perks

Episode list

Transmission and commercial release
The series was made in 1982 but was not shown at the time due to the outbreak of the Falklands War. The programme was deemed unsuitable for transmission owing to its setting. It was first broadcast by the satellite channel UK Gold in 1993, and was finally broadcast on BBC Two in 2000.

All six episodes were released by the BBC on VHS in 1994 and subsequently on DVD, on its own in July 2006 and as part of a Frankie Howerd box-set in October, which also included Up Pompeii! (which never got its own individual DVD release) and a previously released compilation of Howerd's best moments including clips and interview material.

External links
 
 
 Episode guide on ComedySeries.info

BBC television comedy
1990s British comedy television series
1993 British television series debuts
1993 British television series endings
Winston Churchill
English-language television shows